Maleyat Kafr El Zayat is an Egyptian football club based in Kafr El Zayat, Egypt.
In the 2009/10 season Maleyat Kafr El Zayat are playing in the Egyptian Second Division Group C.

Maleyat Kafr El Zayat have played in the Egyptian Premier League 3 for seasons, 1957/58, 1962/63 and 1963/64.

References

Football clubs in Egypt
Sports clubs in Egypt